Gamasiphis is a genus of mites in the family Ologamasidae. There are more than 60 described species in Gamasiphis.

Species
These 68 species belong to the genus Gamasiphis:

 Gamasiphis adanalis Karg, 1990
 Gamasiphis aduncus Ma, 2004
 Gamasiphis anguis Karg, 1993
 Gamasiphis appendicularis Karg, 1993
 Gamasiphis arcuatus Trägårdh, 1952
 Gamasiphis ardor Karg, 1993
 Gamasiphis australicus Womersley, 1956
 Gamasiphis bengalensis Bhattacharyya, 1966
 Gamasiphis benoiti Loots, 1980
 Gamasiphis breviflagelli Karg, 1996
 Gamasiphis brevigenitalis Karg, 1993
 Gamasiphis caper Karg, 1995
 Gamasiphis conciliator Berlese, 1916
 Gamasiphis coniunctus Karg, 1995
 Gamasiphis decoris Karg, 1990
 Gamasiphis denticus Hafez & Nasr, 1979
 Gamasiphis elegantellus Berlese, 1910
 Gamasiphis ellipticus Karg, 1996
 Gamasiphis elongatellus Berlese, 1910
 Gamasiphis erinaceus Karg, 1993
 Gamasiphis euincisus Karg, 1996
 Gamasiphis eumagnus Karg, 1996
 Gamasiphis flagelli Karg, 1993
 Gamasiphis foliatus Karg, 1993
 Gamasiphis fornicatus Lee, 1970
 Gamasiphis furcatus Karg, 1990
 Gamasiphis gamasellus Berlese, 1913
 Gamasiphis gandensius Van Daele, 1975
 Gamasiphis hamatellus Karg, 1998
 Gamasiphis hamifer (Trägårdh, 1952)
 Gamasiphis hemicapillus Karg, 1990
 Gamasiphis holocapillus Karg, 1990
 Gamasiphis hyalinus Karg, 2003
 Gamasiphis illotus Fox, 1949
 Gamasiphis incisus Karg, 1993
 Gamasiphis incudis Karg, 1993
 Gamasiphis indicus Bhattacharyya, 1978
 Gamasiphis krieli Van Driel, Loots & Marais, 1977
 Gamasiphis lanceolatus Karg, 1987
 Gamasiphis lenifornicatus Lee, 1973
 Gamasiphis longiorsetosus Karg, 1997
 Gamasiphis longirimae Karg, 1997
 Gamasiphis macrorbis Karg, 1993
 Gamasiphis maheensis Loots, 1980
 Gamasiphis mediosetosus Karg, 2003
 Gamasiphis minoris Karg, 1996
 Gamasiphis novipulchellus Ma & Yin, 1998
 Gamasiphis ovoides Karg, 1993
 Gamasiphis parpulchellus Nasr & Mersal, 1986
 Gamasiphis paulista Castilho, Moraes & Narita, 2010
 Gamasiphis pilosellus Berlese, 1913
 Gamasiphis pinguis Karg, 1990
 Gamasiphis pinnatus Karg, 1998
 Gamasiphis plenosetosus Karg, 1994
 Gamasiphis productellus Berlese, 1923
 Gamasiphis pulchellus (Berlese, 1887)
 Gamasiphis quadruplicis Karg, 1990
 Gamasiphis saccus Lee, 1973
 Gamasiphis setosus Womersley, 1956
 Gamasiphis sextus Vitzthum, 1921
 Gamasiphis silvestris Karg, 2007
 Gamasiphis spinulosus Karg, 1995
 Gamasiphis superardor Karg, 1993
 Gamasiphis trituberosus Karg, 1990
 Gamasiphis turgicalcareus Ma, 2009
 Gamasiphis uncifer Trägårdh, 1931
 Gamasiphis undulatus Karg & Schorlemmer, 2009
 Gamasiphis vinculi Karg, 1994

References

Ologamasidae